The 1996–97 Eredivisie season was the 37th season of the Eredivisie, the top level of ice hockey in the Netherlands. Eight teams participated in the league, and the Nijmegen Tigers won the championship.

Regular season 
 
(* The Eaters Geleen had two points deducted)

Final round

Playoffs

External links 
 Season on hockeyarchives.info

Neth
Eredivisie (ice hockey) seasons
Ere 
Ere